The Independent Trade Union of Ukrainian Miners (NPGU) is a trade union representing workers in the mining industry in Ukraine.

The union was established in 1989, bringing together members of recently formed strike committees.  In 1993, it was the most prominent union to participate in establishing the Confederation of Free Trade Unions of Ukraine.  Due to a leadership dispute, it withdrew from the confederation in 1996, but soon rejoined.

References

External links

Mining trade unions
Trade unions established in 1989
Trade unions in Ukraine